A constitutional referendum was held in Uruguay on 16 December 1951. The proposed amendments to the constitution were approved by 54% of voters.

Proposals
The proposed changes to the constitution were presented to the General Assembly on 31 June 1951. The Chamber of Deputies approved it by a vote of 85 to 14 on 10 October, whilst the Senate approved it by a vote of 26 to 4 on 26 October.

The amendments would:
reintroduce the colegiado system of government, giving six seats on the National Council of Government to the largest party and three to the second largest party.
provide for a bicameral General Assembly elected by proportional representation.
retain the use of the lema system.
allow petitions for constitutional amendments signed by 10% of registered voters, and allow the General Assembly to put forward a counter-proposal to the proposed amendments.

Results

Aftermath
The colegiado system was reintroduced prior to the 1954 general elections.

References

1951 referendums
1951 in Uruguay
Referendums in Uruguay
Constitutional referendums in Uruguay
December 1951 events in South America